Tropic (also known as “The Trops”) is an unincorporated area in Brevard County, Florida, United States. It is the southernmost area on Merritt Island, and its identity was absorbed into the census-designated place of Merritt Island during the Space Age of the 1950s and 1960s. This portion of Merritt Island is served by County Road 3 (South Tropical Trail) and the Mather's Bridge.

Geography

Surrounding areas
Lotus 
Indian River 
Indian Harbor Beach; Satellite Beach; South Patrick Shores;Banana River 
Indian River; Palm Shores; Sherman Park; Melbourne

Footnotes

Merritt Island, Florida